Niamh McGrath is a camogie player, a member of the Galway senior panel that unsuccessfully contested the All Ireland finals of 2010 and 2011 against Wexford,

Other awards
Senior Gael Linn Cup 2008. Féile na nGael|Féile All-Ireland 2007 with Club, Under-16 All-Ireland 2009 and Minor All-Ireland 2010.

References

External links
 Camogie.ie Official Camogie Association Website

1993 births
Living people
Galway camogie players